A Poke in the Eye... With a Sharp Stick may refer to:

 A Poke in the Eye (With a Sharp Stick), the 1976 Amnesty International benefit show
 A Poke in the Eye... with a Sharp Stick, a 1988 album by the band PIG